Soft Will is the third and final studio album by American indie rock trio Smith Westerns. It was released in June 2013 under Mom + Pop Music, and produced by Chris Coady. It is the band's final album, as they broke up on December 13, 2014.

Track listing

References

2013 albums
Mom + Pop Music albums
Smith Westerns albums